The lhukonzo (Konzo) language, variously rendered Lukonzo, Olukonzo, Olukonzo and konzo, is a Bantu language spoken by the Konzo people of Uganda and the Democratic Republic of the Congo. It has a 77% lexical similarity with Nande. There are many dialects, including Sanza (Ekisanza).

Writing System

Phonetics

Consonants 

In addition to the phonemes noted above, Konzo also has a prenasalized, voiceless /Nt/; and a voiceless alveolar sibilant affricate /Ts/.

Vowels 
Konzo is characterized for having advanced tongue root.

Konzo's IPA Vowel Chart

Basic vocabulary 
List of basic phrases and words.
Good morning – Wabukire
Good afternoon – Wasibire
Good night - Ukeyesaye buholho
Thank you (very much) – Wasingya (kutsibu)
How are you? – Ghune wuthi?
How are you? – Muneyo?
Fine – Ngane ndeke
Sir/Man – Mulhume
Madam/Woman – Mukalhi
Boy – Omuthabana
Girl – Omumbesa
Dear – Mwanithu
Friend – Omukaghu
King – Mukama/Mwami omusinga
2-10 – ibiri, isatu, ini, ithanu, mukagha, musanju, munani, mwenda, ikumi
Car – Engumbaghalhi
Water – Amaghetse
Gift – Kihembo
House - Enumba
Goat - Embene
Dog - Embwa

References 

Languages of the Democratic Republic of the Congo
Languages of Uganda
Great Lakes Bantu languages